The Big 12 Conference first sponsored football in 1996, and has kept annual standings since establishment.

Standings

References

Big 12 Conference
Standings